ABC Daytime (sometimes shortened to ABC-D or ABCD) is a division responsible for the daytime programming block on the ABC Network and syndicated programming. The block has historically encompassed soap operas, game shows and talk shows.

History

ABC Daytime is the daytime programming division of the American Broadcasting Company (ABC) television network, which has been in operation since 1948. ABC Daytime originally began as a block of programming featuring game shows and soap operas, and it quickly became a popular destination for viewers during the daytime hours.

Brian Frons became president of ABC Daytime in 2002.
 When Megan McTavish returned as Head Writer of All My Children in July 2003, she faced criticism for a story that depicted the rape of a lesbian character, Bianca Montgomery. The show also faced opposition to a story of a transgender character in 2006.
 The Writers Guild of America East filed arbitration suits against ABC Daytime, claiming that they violated the strike-termination agreement by retaining replacement writers (those who choose Financial Core Status) who filled in during the strike (including Frons) on All My Children instead of bringing back the writers who had been on strike. "The strike-termination agreement does not allow the retention of replacement writers in lieu of allowing striking writers to return to their jobs. [ABC Daytime] are clearly violating this agreement," said Ira Cure, senior counsel for the Writers Guild of America, East, in a statement. "They have left us no other option but to file arbitrations to ensure that our members will be afforded their rights outlined under this agreement."

In May 2006, ABC Daytime was enlarged with the addition of Soapnet and ABC Media Productions. ABC Daytime was criticized by Susan Lucci for putting profits above their legacy for the 2011 cancellations of All My Children and One Life to Live in favor of lower-cost talk programming such as The Chew. ABC Daytime was folded into ABC Entertainment in 2011.

Times Square Studios (TSS) was created on December 2, 2011 under Vicki Dummer to oversee operations of ABC Daytime and the syndication programs replacing separate daytime and syndicated units. Times Square took over ABC Daytime when Frons' employment contract ended in January 2012. Except for Live with Kelly and Ryan, Times Square took over their remaining soap, all ABC syndicated and lifestyle shows. On October 30, 2014, The View talk show was transferred into Lincoln Square Productions, an ABC News subsidiary, from ABC Entertainment after struggling in ratings and a change in hosts.

One of the earliest and most popular shows in the ABC Daytime lineup was the game show "Who Wants to Be a Millionaire?" which debuted in 1999 and quickly became a cultural phenomenon. The show's popularity helped to revitalize ABC's daytime programming and drew in a large audience of viewers.

Another popular show in the ABC Daytime lineup was the soap opera "All My Children," which aired from 1970 to 2011. The show was known for its dramatic storylines, complex characters, and talented cast of actors. "All My Children" helped to establish ABC as a leader in daytime programming, and it won numerous awards and accolades over the years.

In addition to "Who Wants to Be a Millionaire?" and "All My Children," ABC Daytime has featured a number of other popular shows over the years, including "General Hospital," "The View," and "One Life to Live." These shows have helped to establish ABC as a leader in daytime programming, and they have attracted a large and dedicated audience of viewers.

Times Square Studios reverted to the ABC Daytime name by the time of the appointment of ABC Owned Television Station President Rebecca Campbell as president of ABC Daytime, which still contains syndication, as an additional position.

Current programs

Talk shows

The View
 Debut: August 11, 1997
 Replaced program: Caryl & Marilyn: Real Friends
 Taping location: New York City
 Creators: Barbara Walters, Bill Geddie
 Producing Team: Brian Teta
 Directing Team: Mark Gentile 
 Current Hosts: Whoopi Goldberg (moderator), Joy Behar, Sunny Hostin, Sara Haines, Alyssa Farah Griffin and Ana Navarro

GMA3: What You Need to Know
 Debut: September 10, 2018
 Replaced program: The Chew
 Taping location: New York City
 Creators: 
 Producing Team: 
 Directing Team: 
 Current Hosts: Amy Robach, T. J. Holmes and Dr. Jennifer Ashton

Soap operas

General Hospital
 Debut: April 1, 1963
 Replaced program: Yours for a Song
 Taping location: Los Angeles
 Creators: Frank and Doris Hursley
 Producing Team: Frank Valentini (Executive Producer), Mercer Barrows, Michelle Henry, Mary-Kelly Weir, Jennifer Whittaker-Brogdon (Coordinating Producer), Nneka Garland (Associate Producer)
 Directing Team: Scott McKinsey, William Ludel, Phideaux Xavier, Penny Pengra, Christina Magarian Ucar, Denise Vancleave, Christine Cooper, Paul S. Glass, Craig McManus, Crystal Craft, Peter Fillmore, Dave MacLeod
 Head Writer: Shelly Altman and Chris Van Etten
 Other Writers: Anna Theresa Cascio, Katherine Schock, Christopher Whitesell, Janet Iacobuzio, Scott Sickles, Suzanne Flynn, Andrea Archer Compton, David Rupel, Elizabeth Korte
 Casting Director: Mark Teschner
 Cast: Tabyana Ali, Tajh Bellow, Maurice Benard, Nicholas Chavez, Chad Duell, Michael Easton, Genie Francis, Robert Gossett, Nancy Lee Grahn, Tanisha Harper, Gregory Harrison, Rebecca Herbst, Evan Hofer, Roger Howarth, Finola Hughes, Josh Kelly, Brook Kerr, Katelyn MacMullen, Cameron Mathison, Sofia Mattsson, Eden McCoy, Kelly Monaco, Avery Kristen Pohl, Amanda Setton, Charles Shaughnessy, Kirsten Storms, Josh Swickard, Donnell Turner, Kristina Wagner, Cynthia Watros, Maura West, Laura Wright, Dominic Zamprogna

Former shows on ABC Daytime

Soap operas
A Flame in the Wind (retitled A Time For Us) (1964–1966)
A World Apart (1970–1971)
All My Children (1970–2011)
Confidential for Women (1966)
Dark Shadows (1966–1971)
Loving (1983–1995)
Never Too Young (1965–1966)
One Life to Live (1968–2012)
Port Charles (1997–2003)
Ryan's Hope (1975–1989)
The Best of Everything (1970)
The City (1995–1997)
The Edge of Night (1975–1984; previously on CBS 1956–1975)
The Nurses (1965–1967)
The Young Marrieds (1964–1966)

Other scripted originals
 The ABC Afternoon Playbreak (specials, 1973–1975)
 ABC Afterschool Special (specials, 1972–1997)
 Bewitched
 The Brady Bunch
 Happy Days
 Laverne & Shirley
 The Loretta Young Show
 Love, American Style
 The Love Boat
 The New Love, American Style (1985–1986)
 That Girl
 Three's Company

Game shows

ABC Daytime has not had a regular daytime game show block since 1986, and has not had any daytime game shows since a revival of Match Game ended in 1991.

 The $10,000 Pyramid (1974–1976) and The $20,000 Pyramid (1976–1980; aired on CBS from 1982 to 1988; revived by ABC for primetime as The $100,000 Pyramid in 2016)
 About Faces (1960–1961)
 All-Star Blitz (1985)
 Baby Game (1968)
 Bargain Hunters (1987; replaced by Home in 1988)
 Beat the Clock (1958–1961)
 The Better Sex (1977–1978)
 The Big Showdown (1974–1975)
 Blankety Blanks (1975)
 Break the Bank (1976)
 Bruce Forsyth's Hot Streak (1986)
 Camouflage (1961–1962)
 Chance for Romance (1958)
 The Dating Game (1965–1973)
 Double Talk (1986)
 Dream House (1968–1970; aired on NBC from 1983 to 1984)
 Everybody's Talking (1967)
 Family Feud (1976–1985; currently airing in syndication; a primetime celebrity version was aired by NBC in 2008 and revived by ABC in 2015)
 Funny You Should Ask (1968–1969; revived for broadcast syndication in 2017)
 The Family Game (1967)
 Get the Message (1964)
 The Honeymoon Race (1967)
 Hot Seat (1976)
 How's Your Mother-in-Law? (1967–1968)
 Let's Make a Deal (1968–1976; currently airing on CBS)
 Match Game (1990–1991; revived by ABC for primetime in 2016)
 Missing Links (1964)
 The Money Maze (1974–1975)
 Mother's Day (1958-1959)
 Number Please (1961)
 One in a Million (game show) (1967)
 The Neighbors (1975–1976)
 The Newlywed Game (1966–1974, 1984)
 The Object Is (1963–1964)
 Pantomime Quiz (1959)
 Password (1971–1975; later aired on NBC from 1979–1989; Million Dollar Password aired on CBS in 2008)
 The Price is Right (1963–1965; currently airing on CBS)
 Queen for a Day (1960–1964)
 Rhyme and Reason (1975–1976)
 Second Chance (1977; revived by CBS in 1983 as Press Your Luck, which itself was revived by ABC for primetime in 2019)
 Seven Keys (1961–1964)
 Showoffs (1975)
 Split Second (1972–1975)
 Supermarket Sweep (1965–1967; revival aired on Lifetime and PAX from 1990–2003)
 Temptation (1967–1968)
 Trivia Trap (1984–1985)
 Who Do You Trust? (1957–1963)
 You Don't Say! (1975; later aired in syndication from 1978–1979)
 Yours for a Song (1961–1963)

One game show aired in syndication on the network's owned-and-operated stations:
 Who Wants To Be a Millionaire (2002–present; originally aired on ABC in primetime from 1999 to 2002, 2008 and 2020–present; produced by Valleycrest Productions in association with Celador until 2007, 2waytraffic until 2019, Embassy Row and Kimmelot)

Talk shows and lifestyle programming
 Caryl & Marilyn: Real Friends (1996–1997)
 The Chew (2011–2018)
 The Children's Doctor (1967–1969)
 The Dick Cavett Show (1968–1969)
 Don McNeill's Breakfast Club (1954–1955)
 Fame, Fortune & Romance (1986–1987)
 Good Afternoon America (2012)
 Home (1988–1994)
 Lifestyles of the Rich and Famous (1986)
 Mike and Maty (1994–1996)
 The Don Ho Show (1976)
 The Liberace Show (1958–1959)
 Paul Dixon Show (1952)
 The Peter Lind Hayes Show (1958–1959)
 The Revolution (2012)

Executives
Gail Starkey; Beth Wicke; Sue Johnson; Barbara Bloom (Vice President of Daytime Programming: 1996–2000); Mary Burch (Director of Daytime Programming)

References

See also
CBS Daytime
NBC Daytime

Daytime
American television soap operas
Television programming blocks in the United States